

L

References

Lists of words